(October 15, 1616 – July 2, 1700) was a Japanese daimyō of the Edo period, who ruled the Iino Domain. His court title was Danjō no chū. He was the son of Hoshina Masasada, but was dispossessed of family headship due to his father's adoption of an outside heir. However, after his father's death, Masakage was reinstated, and inherited rulership of the Iino domain. He held a variety of low to mid-level posts in the Tokugawa shogunate, including that of Nikkō Sairei-bugyō, connected with the shrine of Tokugawa Ieyasu at Nikkō.

References
Edo 300 HTML (26 November 2007)

1616 births
1700 deaths
Daimyo
Hoshina clan